Rex Hunt's Fishing Adventure was a fishing television show hosted by Rex Hunt. It aired for fourteen years on the Seven Network.

The show popularised several catchphrases including "yibbida-yibbida" and "Folks, it doesn't get any better than this!".

See also

List of longest-running Australian television series

External links
 
 

Seven Sport
Seven Network original programming
1991 Australian television series debuts
2004 Australian television series endings
Fishing television series
Recreational fishing in Australia
English-language television shows